Whores is a 2005 play by Lee Blessing.

Whores features Raoul de Raoul, a fictional Central American dictator of an unnamed country.  The play alternates between what is presumably reality, where he is living in Florida and defending himself against charges of war crimes, and his imagination, where four nuns play out roles such as his family, pornographic video stars, or dance teachers.

The four women are based on the real life death of three American nuns and one social worker who were beaten, raped, and murdered by five members of the National Guard of El Salvador, which was armed and supported by the United States.

The play attacks both the dictatorships and the United States policies that support them; Raoul complains: "You send us rifles and nuns. You are the least consistent people on the face of the earth." Raoul realizes that he has little power without the backing of the United States; his sexual impotence develops analogously.

External links
Curtain Up reviews
New York Times review
Website

Plays by Lee Blessing
2005 plays
1980 murders of U.S. missionaries in El Salvador
Plays set in Florida